The Ground Breaking: An American City and Its Search for Justice is a 2021 book by Scott Ellsworth that examines the 1921 Tulsa race massacre. The book has one "positive" reviews and ten "rave" reviews according to review aggregator Book Marks. The book was longlisted for the 2022 Andrew Carnegie Medal for Excellence in Nonfiction.

References

2021 non-fiction books
English-language books
E. P. Dutton books
Works about the Tulsa race massacre